Tribbles homolog 1 is a protein kinase that in humans is encoded by the TRIB1 gene.  Orthologs of this protein pseudokinase (pseudoenzyme) can be found almost ubiquitously throughout the animal kingdom. It exerts its biological functions through binding to signalling proteins of the MAPKK level of the MAPK pathway, therefore eliciting a regulatory role in the function of this pathway which mediates proliferation, apoptosis and differentiation in cells. Tribbles-1 is encoded by the trib1 gene, which in humans can be found on chromosome 8 at position 24.13 on the longest arm (q). Recent crystal structures show that Tribbles 1 has an unusual 3D structure, containing a 'broken' C-helix region, a binding site for ubiquitinated substrates such as C/EBPalpha and a key regulatory  C-tail region. Like TRIB2 and TRIB3, TRIB1 has recently been considered as a potential allosteric drug target.

Function 

Tribbles-1 is one of three members of the Tribbles subfamily, which is a part of the CAMK Ser/Thr protein kinase family, of the protein kinase superfamily. The Tribbles subfamily is one of the pseudokinases, meaning that while expressing putative kinase regions in its structure, it is non-catalytic. The Tribbles subfamily lacks a functional ATP binding pocket, and therefore cannot phosphorylate its substrates; instead, Tribbles proteins function as scaffold proteins, which bind their substrates to localize them to or from their function 

Expression of Tribbles-1 is highly variable, constantly changing with respect to time and cell-type, which suggests a large amount of regulation that exists in the cell. The protein's primary structure contains a PEST region, indicative of proteins that are highly susceptible to degradation in the cell; Tribbles-1 plays a role in regulating its own expression by binding to its substrate, which not only produces its function on the MAPK pathway, but also works to protect it from degradation whilst binding. This, in part, creates a positive feedback loop in the function of Tribbles-1, as the function of Tribbles-1 directly aids in the increase of the amount of it. As positive feedback loops are often seen throughout biology in circumstances that require the alleviation of an external stimulus, the positive feedback loop exhibited by Tribbles-1 suggests that it plays a functional role in cell response.

References

Further reading

External links 
 
 

EC 2.7.11